Wishaw South was one of two stations that served the town of Wishaw in Scotland between 1841 and 1958, the other station being Wishaw Central. It was on the Caledonian Main Line, which was later known as the West Coast Main Line.

History 
The station opened on 20 March 1841, on the same day as Overtown station, by the Wishaw and Coltness Railway. It was situated 16 miles south of Glasgow on the West Coast Main Line and was on an embankment. There was also a goods yard that was at ground level with the station, which was used as an oil depot. This was later closed. The station closed in 1958.

References

External links 

Disused railway stations in South Lanarkshire
Former Caledonian Railway stations
Railway stations in Great Britain opened in 1841
Railway stations in Great Britain closed in 1958
1841 establishments in Scotland
1958 disestablishments in Scotland